John Michael Quinn (born December 17, 1945) is an American prelate of the Catholic Church. He was named as the eighth bishop of the former Diocese of Winona in Minnesota in 2008. From 2018 until his retirement in 2022, he served as bishop of the Diocese of Winona-Rochester. Quinn previously served as an auxiliary bishop of the Archdiocese of Detroit in Michigan from 2003 to 2008.

Biography

Early life 

The youngest of three children, John Quinn was born on December 17, 1945, in Detroit, Michigan to George and Mary Quinn. He attended St. Anthony High School and then Sacred Heart Major Seminary in Detroit, obtaining his Bachelor of Philosophy degree.

Quinn also earned a Master of Divinity degree from St. John's Provincial Seminary in Plymouth, Michigan.  He received Master of Religious Studies and Master of Systematic Theology degrees from the University of Detroit Mercy.

Priesthood 
Quinn was ordained to the priesthood for the Archdiocese of Detroit by Bishop Walter Schoenherr on March 17, 1972. He completed his graduate studies at the Catholic University of America in Washington, D.C. Quinn served as an associate pastor in parishes in Farmington, Michigan and Harper Woods, Michigan, before becoming pastor of St. Luke's Parish in Detroit.

In 1990, Quinn was raised by the Vatican to the rank of honorary prelate of his holiness. He also served as the archdiocesan director for justice and peace and for education (1990–2003), and Cardinal Adam Maida's delegate to Sacred Heart Seminary (where Quinn was an adjunct member of the faculty).

Auxiliary Bishop of Detroit

On July 7, 2003, Quinn was appointed by Pope John Paul II as an auxiliary bishop of the Archdiocese of Detroit and titular bishop of Ressiana. He received his episcopal ordination on August 12, 2003, from Cardinal Maida, with Cardinal Edmund Szoka and Bishop Walter Schoenherr serving as co-consecrators. Quinn selected as his episcopal motto: "Rejoice in Hope" (Romans 12:12).

Bishop of Winona
Pope Benedict XVI named Quinn as coadjutor bishop of the Diocese of Winona on October 15, 2008, being formally installed on December 11, 2008. After the retirement of Bishop Bernard Harrington, Quinn automatically became the new bishop of Winona on May 7, 2009.   On March 27, 2018, the Diocese of Winona became the Diocese of Winona-Rochester, with Quinn remaining as bishop. On June 2, 2022, Pope Francis accepted Quinn's resignation as bishop of Winona-Rochesters and appointed Robert Barron as his successor.

See also

 Catholic Church hierarchy
 Catholic Church in the United States
 Historical list of the Catholic bishops of the United States
 List of Catholic bishops of the United States
 Lists of patriarchs, archbishops, and bishops

References

External links
 
 Roman Catholic Diocese of Winona official site

 

1945 births
Living people
Clergy from Detroit
Roman Catholic bishops of Winona
Roman Catholic bishops of Winona-Rochester
Sacred Heart Major Seminary alumni
University of Detroit Mercy alumni
Catholic University of America alumni
Roman Catholic Archdiocese of Detroit
Sacred Heart Major Seminary faculty
Religious leaders from Michigan
21st-century Roman Catholic bishops in the United States